Zürich Stadelhofen railway station is an important local railway station in the city of Zürich, on the Zürich-Rapperswil, Zürich-Winterthur, Zürich-Uster lines of the SBB CFF FFS (Swiss Federal Railways). An adjacent station, is the terminus of the Forchbahn (FB) suburban railway and is served by several lines of the Zürich tram network.

Stadelhofen lies close to the Zürich Opera House and near Bellevue Square. It is located in the city centre next to Lake Zürich and constitutes an early work by architect Santiago Calatrava in the city where he had studied.

History 

Stadelhofen station opened in 1894, at the same time as the Lake Zürich right bank railway (Rechtsufrige Zürichseebahn) from Zürich Hauptbahnhof to Rapperswil station. Until 1990, the station was an intermediate stop on this single track line, which departed from the Hauptbahnhof in a westerly direction, before performing a clockwise 270 degrees turn via a viaduct over the River Limmat and passing through Letten station and the Letten tunnel to Stadelhofen.

In 1990 there were major changes to the railway geography of this part of Zürich. To the north of Stadelhofen, the Letten tunnel was closed and replaced by the twin-track Hirschengraben tunnel, which took a direct route under the River Limmat to Hauptbahnhof, serving new through low level platforms there. At the same time a junction was formed to the south of Stadelhofen, allowing trains leaving Zurich to take either the original right bank line to Tiefenbrunnen station and onwards to Rapperswil, or to travel via the newly built Zürichberg Tunnel to Stettbach station and points to the east and north of Zurich.

Stadelhofen therefore became part of the through west–east backbone of the Zürich S-Bahn, and was rebuilt into its current form with an additional platform and enhanced station infrastructure.

Layout and facilities 
The station is situated to the south-east of Zürich city centre, adjacent to the Stadelhofen city square. The station is on a gentle curve, aligned roughly north to south, with the main station building and square to the west, and a rising hillside to the east. The station has three tracks, alongside a side platform to the west and an island platform to the east. The rail approaches at both ends are in tunnel, with the Hirschengraben Tunnel to Zürich Hauptbahnhof to the north. To the south the line divides inside the tunnel, with one route traversing the Zürichberg Tunnel to Stettbach station and the other a single track tunnel to Tiefenbrunnen station.

The station can be accessed from either side. An underground retail arcade runs the length of the station below the tracks and provides access between the platforms and station entrances. Underground access is supplemented by two bridges which span the station, one carrying a footpath and the other restricted road traffic.

Operation 
Stadelhofen station is a nodal point of the Zürich transport network. The main station is served by lines S3, S5, S6, S7, S9, S11, S12, S15 and S16 of the Zürich S-Bahn, running on the SBB lines. The S20 and S23 provide additional peak-hour service. S-Bahn line S18, running over the Forchbahn, leaves from outside the station, at a stop on Stadelhofenplatz.

All trains from the main Stadelhofen station operate via the Hirschengraben Tunnel and low-level platforms 41–44 at Hauptbahnhof, continuing to Hardbrücke station. They provide, for most of the day, 18 trains per hour (tph) to or from these central Zürich stations. Other stations served include:

  (1 tph)
  (2 tph)
  (/; 4 tph)
  (2 tph)
  (2 tph)
  (/; 4 tph)
  (/; 4 tph)
  (/; 4 tph)
  (2 tph)
  (2 tph)
  (//; 6 tph)
  (/; 2 tph)
  (/; 4 tph)
  (//, 6 tph)
  (//; 6 tph)
  (//, 6 tph)
  (2 tph)
  (2 tph)
  (//, 6 tph)
  (////; 10 tph)

 
The Forchbahn (line S18) runs from the Stadelhofenplatz stop via Forch to Esslingen. The Stadelhofenplatz stop is also served by tram routes 8, 11 and 15 of the Verkehrsbetriebe Zürich, whilst the same operators tram routes 2 and 4 serve the nearby Opernhaus stop. Trams and buses connect Stadelhofen to areas both inside and outside of the city of Zürich.

Summary of all regional train services by Zürich S-Bahn:

 
 
 
 
 
 
 
 
 
 
 
 

During weekends, there are six nighttime S-Bahn services (SN1, SN5, SN6, SN7, SN9, SN18) offered by ZVV:

Architecture 
The existing Stadelhofen station building dates from 1894, and was built in a neoclassical style reflecting the surrounding buildings. In the 1990s the train station was rebuilt by the Spanish architect Santiago Calatrava. The principal challenge of this rebuild was to add a third track to a station constrained by a steep hillside rising above the station to one side, and an urban square to the other.

The resulting design preserved the existing station building on the square side, and excavated the hillside to provide room for the third track and the platform serving it. The hillside was then restored with a multilevel structure that reinstates the walkways and bank above, while providing an open, naturally lit island platform underneath serving the new track and its pre-existing neighbour. The massive canopy over this platform is complemented by a much lighter metal and glass canopy over the platform on the square side of the station. An underground arcade was created beneath the length of the station, providing retail space as well as access between the platforms and station entrances. The arcade is framed by sculptural arches, and is naturally lit through glass blocks embedded on the platforms. As well as the underground arcade, two bridges span the station, linking the city on each side.

Both station building and platforms are inscribed on the Swiss Inventory of Cultural Property of National Significance.

Gallery

See also

History of rail transport in Switzerland
Rail transport in Switzerland

References

External links 
 
 Station data from SBB web site
 Interactive station plan (Zürich Stadelhofen)
 Station plan from SBB web site

Cultural property of national significance in the canton of Zürich
Santiago Calatrava structures
Swiss Federal Railways stations
Stadelhofen
Hochschulen
Railway stations in Switzerland opened in 1894